Science and Engineering Ethics is a quarterly peer-reviewed scientific journal covering ethics as it relates to science and engineering. It was established in 1995 and is published by Springer Science+Business Media. The editors-in-chief are Dena K. Plemmons (University of California, Riverside) and Behnam Taebi (TU Delft, the Netherlands). According to the Journal Citation Reports, the journal has a 2018 impact factor of 2.275.

References

External links

Ethics journals
Publications established in 1995
Springer Science+Business Media academic journals
English-language journals
Quarterly journals